Haiky-Sytenski is a village in western Ukraine. It is in Dubno Raion in Rivne Oblast. It belongs to Krupets rural hromada, one of the hromadas of Ukraine. It has population of 423.

History
In 1906 settlement was a Khutor in Krupets Volost Dubensky Uyezd Volhynian Governorate. It was located 10 verst from Krupets and 41 verst from Dubno.
It included 53 homesteads and 328 residents.

Until 12 June 2020, Haiky-Sytenski belonged to Radyvyliv Raion. The raion was abolished that day as part of the administrative reform of Ukraine.

On 17 July 2020, village was again transferred to Dubno Raion as Radyvyliv Raion was abolished.

Demographics
In 2001 the settlement had 487 inhabitants. Native language as of the Ukrainian Census of 2001:
Ukrainian - 99.18%
Russian& - 0.82%

People
Volodymyr Lemeshchuk (1998–2022), a Ukrainian Captain killed in the Russo-Ukrainian War.
Ivan Lemeshchuk (1993-2014), a Ukrainian soldier killed in the Russo-Ukrainian War.

References 

Villages in Dubno Raion
Volhynian Governorate